Sebastian Wikström (born 20 December 1988) is a Swedish swimmer from Borlänge, representing Upsala SS. Both his parents (Per Wikström and Eva Lundahl) and his brother Christoffer Wikström have represented Sweden.

Clubs
Upsala SS

References

Swedish male swimmers
1988 births
Living people
Upsala Simsällskap swimmers
People from Borlänge Municipality
Sportspeople from Dalarna County